The Compagnie des tramways de Monaco (TM), was created in 1897 by Henri Crovetto, a Monegasque entrepreneur, in order to construct an electric tramway in Monaco.

History 
The company received permission for several lines:
Place d'Armes - Saint Roman, opened on 14 May 1898
Gare de Monaco - Place du Gouvernement, opened on 11 March 1899
Casino - Gare de Monte-Carlo, opened on 3 May 1900

In 1900, the network is connected by the Tramway de Nice et du Littoral (TNL) company
In 1903, the section from the Casino - Gare de Monte-Carlo is withdrawn 
In 1909, the company is absorbed by the TNL

On 26 January 1931, the tramways disappeared from Monaco.

References

See also 
 Rail transport in Monaco

External links
 photo de deux tramways place d'Armes en 1906
photo d'un croisement de deux motrices TNL et TM au Casino,

Monaco
Transport in Monaco